Young Mungo is a 2022 novel by Scottish-American writer Douglas Stuart. It was published by Grove Press on 5 April 2022 and by Picador on 14 April 2022. The novel follows Mungo Hamilton, a gay teenager living in early 1990s Glasgow who falls in love with a boy named James and must confront the homophobia, toxic masculinity and religious conflicts of the society of his time. It is Stuart's second novel, following his Booker Prize-winning debut Shuggie Bain (2020). The novel was critically acclaimed and was chosen as one of the books of the year by publications such as The Washington Post, Time, Reader's Digest, The Telegraph and Vanity Fair.

Plot
The novel opens with Mungo Hamilton, a 15-year-old Scottish teenager, preparing for a trip with two men who his mother met at an Alcoholics Anonymous meeting, St. Christopher and Gallowgate, who plan to take him fishing to learn how to be a man. Months earlier, Mungo was living at home being cared for by his sister Jodie, with the constant threat of being taken away by social services in the absence of his mother, Maureen. One day, he sees James, a Catholic boy who lives across the street from him and who built a dovecote to raise poultry, through his window. The two become friends and soon develop a romance, which becomes their first relationship that does not involve constant acts of violence.

James reveals to Mungo that he is planning to leave home, but Mungo asks him to wait until he turns 16 so he can go with him. Mungo's older brother Hamish calls him and forces him to come to a fight against Catholics from another neighborhood, even though James asked him not to. Mungo does not hit anyone but ends up badly wounded, deciding to look for James to ask him to leave together without waiting any longer. However, Hamish finds them together, so he attempts to murder James by setting him on fire. Mungo intervenes and Hamish takes him back home, where he tells their mother what happened. Maureen is horrified by the possibility that Mungo is gay, so she plans the fishing trip with which the novel opens.

During the fishing trip, Mungo is worried about St. Christopher and Gallowgate, particularly as he realises that they have both recently been in prison. On the second night, the men get drunk and sexually abuse Mungo, who realises they were imprisoned for child molestation. The next day, Mungo goes fishing with St. Christopher while Gallowgate goes shopping for groceries and manages to drown St. Christopher in the lake. Due to the heavy rain he is able to hide the body until the next day, but Gallowgate ultimately finds the corpse and tries to murder Mungo, who stabs him with a knife that Hamish had given him and returns alone to Glasgow.

Mungo meets up with his family, who called the police when they hadn't heard from him. Across the street, Mungo sees James as he is preparing to leave, as Jodie had contacted him to see if he knew anything about Mungo's whereabouts. The police arrive after finding the bodies and ask for Mungo for questioning, but Hamish poses as Mungo in order to protect him and is detained by the police. Mungo and James stare at each other and Mungo starts walking towards him.

Background and publication

Stuart began writing Young Mungo in 2016, after setting aside the finished manuscript of his first novel, Shuggie Bain, due to frustration that he was unable to find a publisher for it. He finished the novel in 2020, before winning the Booker Prize for his first novel. At the time, the novel was tentatively titled Loch Awe and was described by Stuart in an interview as, "a love story between two young men who are separated by territorial gangs, on opposing sectarian lines." The title Loch Awe referenced the fishing trip that Mungo takes in the novel and, according to the author, was changed to Young Mungo to denote the protagonist, the same approach as in Shuggie Bain, as Stuart claimed the two works formed a single "tapestry" alongside this novel.

The novel was published on 5 April 2022 by the American publisher Grove Press, with a cover designed by artist Christopher Moisan showing a teenage boy submerged underwater. The British edition was published by Picador on 14 April 2022, with a cover depicting the well-known photograph "The Cock (Kiss)" by German photographer Wolfgang Tillmans.

Critical reception
The novel was critically acclaimed and was included on several best books of the year lists, including those of The Washington Post, Reader's Digest, Time, Vanity Fair, The Globe and Mail, The Telegraph, Vogue, the Los Angeles Review of Books and Time Out. It was longlisted for the Andrew Carnegie Medal for Excellence in Fiction and the Scottish Highland Literary Award. Kirkus Reviews, in a starred review, wrote that "again this author creates characters so vivid, dilemmas so heart-rending, and dialogue so brilliant that the whole thing sucks you in like a vacuum cleaner." The Publishers Weekly review called the novel "astonishing" and Stuart's prose "stellar," with particular praise for the novel's ending, which the magazine described as a "punch to the heart."

Johanna Thomas-Corr, in her review for The Sunday Times, called it a "rich and affecting group portrait of loneliness", but also "richly abundant" with "colourful characters" and Dickensian with its "moral vision that's expansive and serious while being savagely funny." She criticised the novel's narrative structure and Stuart for "rearranging the core elements of Shuggie Bain (alcoholism, rape, neglect, homophobia, domestic abuse) with the same family dynamics too." Alex Preston, in a review for The Observer, was equally positive in his appreciation of the novel and of Stuart, whom he called a "prodigious talent." Preston focused in particular on the love story between Mungo and James and stated that he cried at the end of the story. The protagonist's love affair was also praised by David Canfield, a reviewer for Vanity Fair, who also noted the detailed moment-to-moment descriptions of the plot.

The novel's prose was praised in Ron Charles's review in The Washington Post, who called Stuart's style poetic, the author a "genius" and the novel a "masterful family drama". Johnathan Self, in an article in The Critic, also praised Stuart's prose and called the novel "Dickinsonian fiction". He further asserted that it was more developed in style and theme than Shuggie Bain. Hillary Kelly of the Los Angeles Times also compared the novel's plot to the literature of Charles Dickens, specifically David Copperfield, and stated that it was striking how successful Stuart was in developing the narrative arc and conveying the character's emotions.

Molly Young for The New York Times noted the "mad grandeur" of the novel and the "beauty" of the language employed by Stuart, while also criticising the descriptions of the characters' emotions, since the plot, according to Young, gave the reader enough information to understand them without needing to reiterate them. She also spoke negatively of the violent events in the story and stated that some readers might feel like "misery tourists." The violence of the plot was also criticised by Kevin Quinn of Post Magazine, who said it risked overshadowing Stuart's literary skill, while praising the construction of Mungo's inner life.

References

2022 American novels
2022 British novels
Grove Press books
Picador (imprint) books
Novels set in Glasgow
Novels set in Scotland
2020s LGBT novels
American LGBT novels
British LGBT novels
Novels with gay themes
Scottish novels